Andrew Newell (born 28 February 1978 in  Terrigal, New South Wales)  is a Paralympic athletics competitor from New South Wales, Australia.  Newell has an intellectual disability. He won two bronze medals at the 2000 Sydney Games in the men's 100m T20 event and the men's 400m T20 event. He competed at the 2002 IPC Athletics World Championships in 100m T20 and finished seventh in the final.

References

Paralympic athletes of Australia
Athletes (track and field) at the 2000 Summer Paralympics
Paralympic bronze medalists for Australia
Living people
Medalists at the 2000 Summer Paralympics
1978 births
Intellectual Disability category Paralympic competitors
People from the Central Coast (New South Wales)
Competitors in athletics with intellectual disability
Paralympic medalists in athletics (track and field)
Australian male sprinters
Sportsmen from New South Wales